Jack Beer (born June 15, 1999) is an American soccer player who plays for New York City FC II in the MLS Next Pro.

Playing career

Youth
Beer spent a number of years with local team New York Soccer Club, where his team won the NPL National Championship in both 2015 and 2016, and several other competitions. He also set the club record for the most goals scored in a single season, while playing in the u-13/14 category.

College
In 2017, Beer attended Georgetown University to play college soccer. In the 2017 season he played 20 games, scoring once, while in the 2019 season he scored twice in 24 games.

Senior
After leaving college, Beer played for Lansdowne Yonkers FC. He featured for them in their 2021–2022 season, during a spell in which the club would sustain an unbeaten run lasting more than 15 months and would win a number of trophies, including the 2021 National Amateur Cup.

On March 24, 2022, it was announced that Beer had signed with MLS Next Pro side New York City FC II ahead of the league's inaugural season. His competitive professional debut came in a loss on penalties against New England Revolution II on March 27, 2022. He scored his first goal as a professional in a 3–1 loss against Toronto FC II two weeks later.

Career statistics
.

References 

1999 births
American soccer players
Association football midfielders
Living people
Soccer players from New York (state)
Georgetown Hoyas men's soccer players
New York City FC II players
MLS Next Pro players